To Skin a Spy is a 1966 French-Italian thriller film directed by Jacques Deray.  The film details the journey of a French spy sent to Vienna to stop a security leak whose mission is re-directed when he comes into contact with international enemy agents.

Cast 
 Lino Ventura - Pascal Fabre
 Jean Servais - Weigelt
 Marilù Tolo - Anna
 Jean Bouise - Margeri
 Wolfgang Preiss - Chalieff
 Louis Arbessier - The Colonel
 Adrian Hoven - Mr. Kern
  - Mrs. Kern 
 Charles Régnier - Ehrfurt
 Reinhard Kolldehoff - Hoffmann
 Mino Doro

References

External links 

1960s spy drama films
1960s spy thriller films
French spy drama films
French spy thriller films
Italian drama films
Cold War spy films
Films set in Vienna
Films with screenplays by José Giovanni
1966 drama films
1966 films
1960s Italian films
1960s French films